Song Ji-Hyeon (Korean: 송지현; born January 23, 1969), also spelled as Song Ji-Hyeon, is a South Korean team handball player and Olympic champion.
She won a gold medal with the South Korean team at the 1988 Summer Olympics in Seoul.

References

External links

1969 births
Living people
South Korean female handball players
Olympic handball players of South Korea
Handball players at the 1988 Summer Olympics
Olympic gold medalists for South Korea
Olympic medalists in handball
Asian Games medalists in handball
Handball players at the 1990 Asian Games
Medalists at the 1988 Summer Olympics
Asian Games gold medalists for South Korea
Medalists at the 1990 Asian Games
20th-century South Korean women